Sisters on the Road (lit. "Now, things are just fine as they are") is a South Korean independent film written and directed by Boo Ji-young, and starring Shin Min-a and Gong Hyo-jin.

Filming was in 2007 and its world premiere was at the 2008 Busan International Film Festival. It was released in South Korean theaters in 2009.

Plot
The sudden death of her mother brings Myung-eun back home to Jeju island. There she meets her estranged sister Myung-ju and Myung-ju's daughter Seung-ah, still living at their old home, and Hyun-ah who has lived with them for over 20 years like a relative. A career woman whose hard exterior masks her illegitimacy and abandonment issues, Myung-eun tells Hyun-ah she wants to start looking for her father after the funeral. Single-minded in her desire to dig up memories of her father and discover why he left, Myung-eun resents that Myung-ju, who like their mother is a carefree fish trader and an unmarried mother of a young daughter, seemingly doesn't care. At first Myung-ju is reluctant to accompany Myung-eun, but after Hyun-ah persuades her, guilt and her sense of duty as an older sibling prevails. And so the two sisters who are dissimilar in character, lifestyle and even fathers go on a road trip together. On their trip, Myung-eun and Myung-ju quarrel over their differences, share secrets, reminisce about their past, and eventually embrace each other as family.

Director Boo Ji-young captures the delicately subtle atmosphere floating between women, and how inscrutable life is.

Cast
Shin Min-a as Park Myung-eun
Gong Hyo-jin as Oh Myung-ju
Kim Sang-hyun as Hyun-ah
Lee Seon-hee as Eun-shil
Chu Kwi-jung as Hye-sook 
Moon Jae-woon as Hyun-sik 
Bae Eun-jin as Seung-ah

References

External links 
 
 
 

2008 films
2008 drama films
South Korean independent films
2000s drama road movies
South Korean LGBT-related films
Transgender-related films
Sponge Entertainment films
2000s Korean-language films
South Korean drama road movies
2008 LGBT-related films
2008 independent films
2000s South Korean films